Gaane Ki Aane is a 2016 Indian Assamese language musical romance film directed by Rajesh Jashpal. It stars Zubeen Garg and Parineeta Borthakur in the lead roles.

Synopsis 
The story is about a musical superstar Nilabh Jonak Baruah, played by Zubeen Garg, and his love and challenges.

Cast 
 Zubeen Garg as Nilabh Jonak Baruah
 Parineeta Borthakur as Madhumita
Rimpi Das as Rani
 Hiranya Deka as Hiru 'HD' Das
 Rajesh Jashpal as Rani's brother
Rina Bora as Nilabh's grandmother
Nipon Goswami as Mr. Benerjee

Soundtrack 

The music of Gaane Ki Aane is composed by Zubeen Garg. Lyrics are by Zubeen Garg, Sasanka Samir and Hiren Bhattacharya. Apart from Zubeen Garg singers like Zublee, Parineeta, Mahalaxmi, Anindita & Madhusmita have rendered their voices in the beautiful tracks.

References

External links 
 

Films set in Assam
Assamese-language remakes of Hindi films
2010s Assamese-language films